Rud Shir-e Olya (also Romanized as Rūd Shīr-e ‘Olyā; also known as Bīd Moḩammadī, Rūd Shīr-e Bālā, and Rūd Shīr-e Bīd Moḩammadī) is a village in Khafri Rural District, in the Central District of Sepidan County, Fars Province, Iran. At the 2006 census, its population was 84, in 22 families.

References 

Populated places in Sepidan County